Theo Sauder (born 2 April 1996) is a Canadian rugby union player that plays fullback and fly-half.  He currently plays for the Toronto Arrows in Major League Rugby as well as the Canada national rugby sevens team.

Early life
Sauder was born in Vancouver, British Columbia, and attended St. George's School. After graduating from St. George's he attended University of British Columbia for his university studies.

Rugby career
In 2015, Sauder played for Canada U20 at the 2015 World Rugby Under 20 Trophy. He played for the Canada U20s again in 2016 but lost to United States U20 19-18 in the qualifier for the 2016 World Rugby Under 20 Trophy, therefore he did not get the play in the tournament that year.

He came off the bench as a substitute in the 55th minute. He scored 2 tries and a conversion.

On 6 November 2018, Sauder signed with the Toronto Arrows ahead of their 2019 debut season in Major League Rugby. On 27 September 2019, he was included in the Canadian squad for the 2019 Rugby World Cup as an injury replacement to Ben LeSage.

Sevens
In June 2021, Sauder was named to Canada's 2020 Summer Olympics team.

References 

1996 births
Living people
Canadian rugby union players
Sportspeople from Vancouver
Toronto Arrows players
St. George's School (Vancouver) alumni
BC Bears players
Rugby union fullbacks
University of British Columbia alumni
Canada international rugby union players
Rugby sevens players at the 2020 Summer Olympics
Olympic rugby sevens players of Canada